Leopecten is a genus of bivalves belonging to the family Pectinidae.

The genus has almost cosmopolitan distribution.

Species:

Leopecten cocosensis 
Leopecten diegensis 
Leopecten isabelensis 
Leopecten sericeus 
Leopecten stillmani

References

Pectinidae
Bivalve genera